Fumiyuki Murakami (born 14 June 1985) is a Japanese snowboarder. He competed in the men's halfpipe event at the 2006 Winter Olympics.

References

1985 births
Living people
Japanese male snowboarders
Olympic snowboarders of Japan
Snowboarders at the 2006 Winter Olympics
Sportspeople from Sapporo
Snowboarders at the 2003 Asian Winter Games
21st-century Japanese people